Si Banphot is a district (amphoe) of Phatthalung province, southern Thailand. It may also be spelled Sri Banphot.

Geography
Neighboring districts are (from the north clockwise) Pa Phayom, Khuan Khanun, and Srinagarindra of Phatthalung Province, Na Yong, Mueang Trang, and Huai Yot of Trang province.

History
The minor district was established on 1 December 1977, when three tambons were split off from Khuan Khanun district. It was upgraded to a full district on 4 November 1993.

Administration
The district is divided into three sub-districts (tambons), which are further subdivided into 30 villages (mubans). There are no municipal (thesaban) areas. There are three tambon administrative organizations (TAO).

References

External links
amphoe.com

Districts of Phatthalung province